Hunter Long (born August 19, 1998) is an American football tight end for the Los Angeles Rams of the National Football League (NFL). He played college football at Boston College and was drafted by the Miami Dolphins in the third round of the 2021 NFL Draft.

Early years
Long grew up in Exeter, New Hampshire. He graduated from Exeter High School before doing a postgraduate year at Deerfield Academy in Deerfield, Massachusetts.  He played tight end and defensive end in high school. As a senior he had 30 receptions for 508 yards with two touchdowns and had seven sacks. He committed to Boston College to play college football.

College career
Long redshirted his first year at Boston College in 2017. In 2018, he played in 12 games and had four receptions for 103 yards and two touchdowns. In 2019, Long had 28 receptions for 509 yards with two touchdowns. He returned as the starting tight end in 2020.

Professional career

Miami Dolphins
Long was selected by the Miami Dolphins in the third round (81st overall) of the 2021 NFL Draft. Long signed his four-year rookie contract with Miami on July 26, 2021.

Los Angeles Rams
On March 15, 2023, Long and a 2023 third-round draft pick were traded to the Los Angeles Rams in exchange for cornerback Jalen Ramsey.

References

External links
Boston College Eagles bio

1998 births
Living people
People from Exeter, New Hampshire
Sportspeople from Rockingham County, New Hampshire
Players of American football from New Hampshire
American football tight ends
Boston College Eagles football players
Miami Dolphins players
Los Angeles Rams players